J. Paul Fedoroff (born August 23, 1958; died January 16, 2023) is a Canadian forensic psychiatrist, sexologist, and researcher who specialized in treating individuals with paraphilic disorders and/or individuals with developmental delay. He was the first director of the Sexual Behaviours Clinic (SBC) at the Institute of Mental Health Research at the Royal Ottawa Mental Health Centre located in Ottawa, Ontario. He was a full professor of forensic psychiatry, criminology, and law at the University of Ottawa.

Fedoroff was known for his research on assessing and treating individuals who have committed sexual offences and/or individuals who have problematic sexual interests (known as paraphilic interests). One of his research article claimed to prove that pedophilia could be cured, but his conclusions were dismissed by the scientific community.

Biography

Early life and education 

John Paul Fedoroff was born and raised in Saskatoon, Saskatchewan. He is the son of Sergey Fedoroff, the fourth president of the Pan American Association of Anatomy (1975-1978), who is considered the father of tissue culture for his research in tissue culture and nerve cell regeneration.

In 1980, Fedoroff graduated with a Bachelor of Arts (advanced) in psychology from the University of Saskatchewan. He went on to pursue medical school at the College of Medicine at the University of Saskatchewan. He pursued a Senior Clinical Fellow in Neuropsychiatry and a Clinical Fellow in Advanced Psychiatry at the Johns Hopkins Medical Institutions from 1988 to 1990. At Johns Hopkins, he was supervised by Dr. John Money, who is known for his research on gender and theory of lovemaps. In 1990, Fedoroff then pursued a Clinical Fellow in Forensic Psychiatry at the Clark Institute of Psychiatry at the University of Toronto.

Career 
Fedoroff worked at several psychiatry sites as a staff psychiatrist, including: Johns Hopkins School of Medicine, Toronto Hospital, Whitby Medical Health Centre, and Centre for Addiction and Mental Health (CAMH).

In 2001, he became a member of the Ontario Review Board. In 2010, he became an appointed member of the Association for the Treatment of Sexual Abusers (ATSA) for the International Policy Committee. That same year, he became the chair of the Committee on Sex Offenders for the American Academy of Psychiatry and the Law.

Sexual Behaviours Clinic 
Fedoroff was the first director of the Sexual Behaviours Clinic, otherwise known as the SBC, located at the Royal Ottawa Mental Health Centre in Ottawa, Canada. Under the directorship of Fedoroff, the SBC won many awards, including the Gold Achievement Award from the APA (2015) and the Innovation Award from Crime Prevention Ottawa (2018). 

The SBC has also published with researchers who are a part of the German Dunkelfeld Project.

Views

Pedophilia 
Psychiatrist Paul Fedoroff and the ROMHC have come under criticism for claims they could cure pedophilia, despite the medical consensus of the opposite. In 2014, Fedoroff claimed his program can treat pedophilia and other disorders "so successfully that people who were aroused by children, exhibitionism or rape can eventually lead healthy, consensual sex lives."  This contrasted with other experts who said, "There is absolutely, positively no evidence that we can cure 'a paraphilic disorder'".

Fedoroff based his claim on his study of 43 men showed pedophilia on a phallometric test (where the men's erection responses were measured).  When these men were tested again, 21 of them showed less response to children and more response to adults.  The study was strongly criticized, with experts noting that Fedoroff's measurement technique was unreliable and could be manipulated by the test-takers trying to look normal, and that the finding was actually a statistical illusion caused by a phenomenon called regression to the mean. According to sex researcher J. Michael Bailey, "I think his data were not appreciably different than random coin tossing...Extraordinary claims require extraordinary evidence, and yet Paul's paper is extraordinarily weak."

In 2016, Andreas Mokros and Elmar Habermeyer, sex researchers at the University Hospital of Zurich used Fedoroff's original data and applied statistical modelling of Fedoroff's method to test its validity.  Their results verified the previous criticisms, showing directly that Fedoroff's method was invalid and that his reported finding was actually a statistical artefact, indistinguishable from random variation.  Fedoroff dismissed the analyses and criticisms, however, saying they "are concerns to be raised about any un-replicated study" and asking "Why all the fuss about this one, especially since the news appears to be good?"

In 2017, Fedoroff and the ROMHC continued their claims of success (called a "boast" by the National Post). According to Fedoroff, "We have evidence all day from people who say they’ve gotten better.....People always come back saying ‘This is much better, I enjoy this so much more than what I used to go through". According to Professor Martin Lalumiere of the University of Ottawa, standard treatment focuses on strategies to avoid trouble (such as avoiding situations where the person is alone with children). In the method Fedoroff describes, pedophiles are taught to find sexual stimulation from people their own age, in repeated sessions using adult pornography as practice.  According to James Cantor, a sex researcher known for his MRI studies of pedophilia, what ROHMC clinic is doing is equivalent to the failed “conversion therapy” of homosexuality. Fedoroff's response to the National Post was that there is no evidence that pedophilia cannot be altered and that he and his team are "working on" studies to prove their claims. Fedoroff also promoted his "treatment" in the United States, the Czech Republic and Russia.

Transgender healthcare 
Federoff opposed public funding for gender-affirming surgery and did not believe they constitute a cure for "Transexuality", which he believed was a psychiatric condition. Instead, he believed the cure would be created though psychiatric research, and that the cure was not yet invented.

Awards and honours 

In 2015, Fedoroff was the president of the International Academy of Sex Research (IASR) and the Canadian Association of Psychiatry and the Law. He was also awarded as Specialist of the Year from the Royal College of Physicians and Surgeons of Canada in the same year. During the same year, his work was also recognized by the American Psychiatric Association (APA). The APA awarded the Sexual Behaviours Clinic with the Gold Achievement Award. The Gold Achievement Award is the highest honour from the APA for excellence in academic clinical research program in North America.

In 2017, he was awarded the Earl L. Loschen Award for Clinical Practice from the National Association for the Dually Diagnosed (NADD).

In 2018, the Sexual Behaviours Clinic was awarded the Innovation Award from Crime Prevention Ottawa for community safety. This award was given for his team's work in preventing sex crimes in the community by treating individuals who are at risk of committing them.

Bibliography
Fedoroff published over 100 research articles and book chapters, and over 200 scientific presentations and talks around the world.

References 

1958 births
Living people
Canadian psychiatrists
Canadian sexologists
People from Saskatoon